Luciano Cruz-Coke Carvallo (born July 1, 1970  in Santiago, Chile) is a Chilean actor, and was the Minister of Arts and Culture under the 35th President Sebastián Piñera.

Biography
Cruz-Coke is the son of lawyer and university professor Carlos Cruz-Coke Ossa and Lucía Carvallo Arriagada. His brother is Carlos Cruz-Coke Carvallo, Councilman of Vitacura in Santiago; the nephew of cultural manager Marta Cruz-Coke and grandnephew of physician-politician Eduardo Cruz-Coke (Marta's father).

Cruz-Coke studied in the Colegio de los Sagrados Corazones de Manquehue. He went on to study law in the Universidad Finis Terrae, later changing his major to Architecture and finally became an actor. He studied acting at the Lee Strasberg Theatre and Film Institute in New York City. He holds a degree in Documentary Filming from the Academy of Christian Humanism University and a master's degree in Mass Communications from University of Chile.

Career
Cruz-Coke has a fifteen-year acting career in film, theater and television. He is also the founder and director of the non-profit organization Teatro Lastarria 90, which caters to activities in film, theater and visual arts. Lastarria 90 has become a model innovator, attracting both private and public supporters, and which has received recognition en the world of the arts and critique.

He was spotted by an executive of Canal 13 in a pub while he was singing. His first television role was in 1995 in the series El Amor Esta de Moda, where he became known as the "romeo" of telenovela. He would go on to play further roles in other series. He won the award Apes in 2004 for his part in a telenovela Destinos Cruzados.

Politics
Cruz-Coke was the founder of the Comisión Cultura de los Grupos Tantauco (Cultural Commission of the Tantauco Groups). During the 2009-2010 Chilean Presidential elections he openly supported the current President-elect Sebastián Piñera, who would later nominate him to the Ministry of Arts and Culture. Luciano is one of the founders of Evópoli, a conservative-liberal and centre-right party.

Personal life

Cruz-Coke has Spanish, French, Basque, English and Mapuche ancestry.

Cruz-Coke is a practicing Roman Catholic.

Cruz-Coke is married to Javiera García-Huidobro Aninat and is the father of five children.

Acting

Film
 Se arrienda (2005) as Gastón Fernández
 Gente Decente (2004) as Andrés
 En un Lugar de la Noche (2000) as Simón
 Bienvenida Casandra (1996) as Padre
 4 °C
 Vino con sabor a vodka

Series
 Una Pareja Dispareja (2009) Félix
 Los Simuladores: El Gran Juicio (2005) as Alberto Bunster
 Amigas en Bach (2004) as Alejandro
 Amor a Domicilio, la comedia (1996) as Benjamín Smith

Soap Operas
 El amor está de moda (1995) as Juan Pablo Sepúlveda
 Amor a Domicilio (1995) as Benjamín Smith
 Adrenalina (1996) as Andrés Betancourt
 Amándote (1998) as Julián Trosciani
 Fuera de Control (1999) as Axel Schumacher  
 Sabor a Ti (2000) as Feliciano Calquín
 Amores de Mercado (2001) as Ignacio Valdés   
 Purasangre (2002) as Gabriel Callassi
 Pecadores (2003) as Angello Botero       
 Destinos Cruzados (2004) as Mateo Goycolea        
 Gatas & Tuercas (2005) as Borja San Juan
 Charly Tango (2006)  as Álvaro Edwards Salazar 
 Fortunato (2007)  as ''Raul Cuevas / Judith Mendez

Theater
"Moscas sobre el mármol" of L.A.Heiremanns dir. Alejandro Castillo (2009)
"Gorda" de Nelly Labute dir. Alejandro Castillo	(2009)
"Criminal" de C. Daulte dir. Alejandro Goic (2007)
"Normal" de A. Neilson. Junto a Hector Noguera dir. Claudio Santana (2006)
"Homero/Iliada" de Alessandro Barrico dir. Hector Noguera (2008)
"Julio Cesar" de Shakespeare. dir. F. Albornoz (2005)
"Enigmas" E. E:Schmitt dir. Willy Semler (2004)
"Asesinos" de R. Achondo en Lastarria 90.  Dir. Rodrigo Achondo. (2002)
"La señorita Julia" de Strindberg en Teatro Municipal. Dir. Felipe Braun (2003)
"Fragmentos leídos por geólogos" de N.Chaurette  Dir. Felipe Braun. (2002)
"La Indagación" P.Weiss en Teatro UC- I. Goethe Dir. R.Lopez, R.Griffero  (2002)
"Largo viaje del día hacia la noche" E. O'Neill Teatro UC Dir. Willy Semler (2001)
"Zoológico de cristal" de T. Williams, Teatro El Conventillo Dir. A. Cohen (2000)
"Dios ha muerto" de M.A. De la Parra. Cía. La puerta Dir.  Luis Ureta. (1999)
"Sostiene Pereira" de A. Tabucci ICTUS. Dir. Nissim Sharim. (1999)
"Three Sisters" de A. Chejov Off-Broadway, N. York Dir. George Loros. (1999)

References

1970 births
Living people
University of Chile alumni
Lee Strasberg Theatre and Film Institute alumni
Chilean male film actors
Chilean male stage actors
Chilean male telenovela actors
Chilean male television actors
Government ministers of Chile
Chilean actor-politicians
Evópoli politicians
Chilean people of French descent
Chilean people of Basque descent
Chilean people of Spanish descent
Chilean people of English descent
Chilean people of Danish descent
Chilean Roman Catholics
Members of the Chamber of Deputies of Chile
Senators of the LVI Legislative Period of the National Congress of Chile